The 2013-14 Angola men's basketball cup is a basketball competition held in Angola. The women's tournament was contested by only three teams following the withdrawal of G.D. Juventude de Viana for administrative reasons. The tournament, that ran from December 10–19, 2013.

2014 Angola Men's Basketball Cup

Preliminary rounds

Group 1

Group 2

Final round

2014 Angola Women's Basketball Cup
The 2014 Women's Cup was contested by three teams, with the 2-leg cup finals decided by playoff, with Interclube winning the title.

Preliminary stage

Day 1

Day 2

Day 3

Knockout stage

 Advanced to semifinals as title holder.

See also
 2014 Angola Basketball Super Cup
 2014 BAI Basket
 2014 Victorino Cunha Cup

References

Angola Basketball Cup seasons
Cup